Jelatek LRT station is an LRT station in Kuala Lumpur that is served by Rapid KL's Kelana Jaya Line.

Trunk buses 

Kelana Jaya Line
Railway stations opened in 1999
1999 establishments in Malaysia
20th-century architecture in Malaysia